Cerveza is a Spanish word meaning beer. It may also refer specifically to:

Beers
Cerveza Cristal, a Peruvian beer
Cerveza Panama, a popular Panamanian beers
Cerveza Pilsener, an Ecuadorian pilsner
Cerveza Polar, a lager brewed by Empresas Polar
Pacífico, or Cerveza Pacífico Clara, a Mexican pilsner

Brewing companies 
Cerveza Quilmes, an Argentinian brewery
FEMSA Cerveza, a Mexican brewing company
Tijuana Beer, in Spanish Cerveza Tijuana, a Mexican microbrewery

Other
Cerveza preparada, a Mexican term for a type of beer mixed with juices or sauces
Challenger ATP Club Premium Open, better known as the Cerveza Club Open, an Ecuadorian tennis tournament